Isaac Sappe Lane (November 27, 1888 – September 18, 1979) was an American Negro league third baseman from 1918 to 1922.

A native of Screven, Georgia, Lane attended Wilberforce University. He made his major league debut with the Dayton Marcos in 1918, and went on to play for the Columbus Buckeyes in 1921, and Detroit Stars in 1922. Lane died in Xenia, Ohio in 1979 at age 90.

References

External links
 and Baseball-Reference Black Baseball stats and Seamheads

1888 births
1979 deaths
Columbus Buckeyes (Negro leagues) players
Dayton Marcos players
Detroit Stars players
Baseball players from Georgia (U.S. state)
People from Wayne County, Georgia
Baseball third basemen
20th-century African-American people